HMS Assiduous was the former pirate vessel Jackal, captured in 1823. On 24 June 1824 Assiduous and  captured a pirate schooner. Lieutenant Richard Dowse commissioned Assiduous in November 1824. They chased her into Cardinas (or Cardanas). There the Spanish authorities refused to permit the British permission to seize her, despite an inspection revealing that she had carried slaves. The vessel was Magico, and  finally captured her in 1826.

The navy sold Assiduous on 5 May 1825.

Post script
Vice Admiral Lawrence Halsted, Commander-in-Chief, West Indies, ordered  and  built on the lines of Assiduous.

Citations

References
 
 

1823 ships
Pirate ships
Captured ships
Schooners of the Royal Navy
Ships involved in anti-piracy efforts